Fraser International College (FIC) is located in Burnaby, British Columbia, Canada and was opened in September 2006.

FIC is a private educational business that operates under an agreement with Simon Fraser University.  Courses at FIC are designed in consultation with faculty and departments at SFU, which allows for an oversight of course material and quality.

While under original and preliminary discussions at SFU, the FIC proposal (then called IBT) was the source of no deal of controversy.  FIC is operated by Navitas Limited, a publicly listed Australian educational company (formally International Business and Technology Education Ltd.).

FIC currently has more than 1300 students enrolled. Students in FIC come from more than 35 countries/regions.

Undergraduate Program
FIC provides 1-year pre-university programs (UTP Stage II) and guarantees direct transfer to Simon Fraser University when GPA reaches the standards according to different majors. The programs of UTP Stage II are relevant to first year programs at Simon Fraser University. Students need to take required credits for transfer and the required courses are based on the majors.

Majors in UTP Stage II
Arts and Social Sciences 

Business Administration 

Communication and Business 

Communication, Art and Technology

Computing Science 

Engineering Science 

Environment

Health Science

Associate of Arts Degree
FIC also has an Associate of Arts Degree with a duration of 2 years.

Foundation Program
The Foundation program (UTP Stage I) is a program for students to prepare for the university-level programs in Business Administration, Computing Science, Engineering Science, or Arts and Social Sciences. Students in this stage need to consider their planned university major to choose 8 courses from a list before going to Stage II.

Course List of UTP Stage I 
Beginning with Algebra

Business Management 

English Skills/Reading 

Introduction to Computers and their Applications 

Introduction to Computing Concepts and Algorithms 

Introduction to Economics

Introduction to Mathematics 

Introduction to Philosophical Reasoning 

Introduction to University Life 1

Introduction to University Writing 

World Issues

External links

 Official Website

References

Schools in British Columbia
Universities and colleges in British Columbia
International schools in British Columbia